PTC News is a Punjabi language news channel. Indian politician and the president of the Shiromani Akali Dal Sukhbir Singh Badal holds a majority stake in PTC. The channel has production studios in Delhi, Mohali, Toronto, New York and London. It broadcasts over all cable networks and DTH platforms in India, on dish network & Sling in the United States, Rogers, Bell, Telus & Shaw in Canada and on Yupp TV on IPTV worldwide.

References

Television channels based in Noida
Television channels and stations established in 2007
Punjabi-language television channels in India